Ready to Strike is the debut studio album by American heavy metal band King Kobra, released in 1985 by Capitol Records.

The single "Hunger" was written by members of the Canadian metal band Kick Axe and was released by them in 1986 in The Transformers: The Movie soundtrack album, under the alias Spectre General.

Track listing
 "Ready to Strike" (King Kobra, H. Banger, Spencer Proffer) - 5:20
 "Hunger" (Proffer, Larry Gillstrom, Brian Gillstrom, Victor Langen, George Criston, Raymond Harvey) - 3:26
 "Shadow Rider" (King Kobra, H. Banger, Proffer) - 4:04
 "Shake Up" (King Kobra, H. Banger, Proffer) - 3:29
 "Attention" (King Kobra, H. Banger, Proffer) - 3:43
 "Breakin' Out" (King Kobra) - 3:59
 "Tough Guys" (King Kobra, H. Banger, Proffer) - 4:21
 "Dancing with Desire" (King Kobra, H. Banger, Proffer) - 5:36
 "Second Thoughts" (King Kobra, Proffer) - 3:47
 "Piece of the Rock" (Proffer, L.Gillstrom, B.Gillstrom, Langen, Criston, Harvey) - 3:33

Personnel
Production and performance credits are adapted from the album liner notes.

Band members
 Mark Free – lead and backing vocals
 David Michael-Philips – lead and rhythm guitars, guitar synthesizer, backing vocals
 Mick Sweda – lead and rhythm guitars, guitar synthesizer, backing vocals
 Johnny Rod – bass, backing vocals
 Carmine Appice – drums, electric and acoustic percussion, backing vocals, associate producer

Production
 Spencer Proffer – producer (for Pasha), additional engineer, arrangements
 King Kobra – arrangements, cover concept
 Duane Baron – engineer
 Alex Woltman – assistant engineer
 Hanspeter Huber – additional engineer
 George Marino – mastering at Sterling Sound, New York
 Vigon Seireeni – art direction, design
 Ray Tusken – A&R coordination for Capitol
 Carol Peters – coordination for Pasha
 Cathy Goodman – coordination for Miller Management
 Allan Miller – management for Miller Management

References

1985 debut albums
King Kobra albums
Capitol Records albums